Oxigen Services is an Indian fintech company. It is involved in the micropayment of services and remittances in real time.

In June 2016, the company reported that its transaction volume rate increased to 600 million transactions per year with a customer base of more than 150 million.

History
The company  started in 2004 by an alumnus of IIT Roorkee with seed capital of ₹4 crores.

In 2006, Oxigen Services received $11.5 million from Citi Venture Capital, USA and then $35 million from Microsoft in 2008.

The firm launched India’s first non-banked mobile wallet, approved by RBI in 2013 for instant money transfers to any bank. These money transfers are available real-time in association with National Payments Corporation of India using IMPS.

In 2014, the company was estimated at $150 million (₹921 crores).

In 2016, Oxigen became a part of the Bharat Bill Payment System to connect users with the central bill payments and settlement system of National Payments Corporation of India.

The firm set up ‘Super PoS - Micro ATM’ (point of sale) terminals to meet the requirements of merchants. This Super PoS works as Micro ATM - Cash-In and Cash-Out, biometric scanner for Aadhaar transactions, Jan Dhan account servicing, merchant payments and eKYC.

Services
 Money transfer
 Recharge
 Bill Payments
Kiosk Banking (SBI Customer Service Point - no frills account) (RBL Kiosk Banking & Money Transfer Agent)
 Aadhaar and eKYC
 Ticket Booking (Railways/Airlines/Bus/Movie)
 Super PoS/Micro ATM
 Virtual Visa
Mobile Wallet

Oxigen Wallet
Oxigen Wallet, powered by Oxigen Services Pvt. Ltd. is India’s first non-bank wallet, approved by Reserve Bank of India allowing customers to send and receive money through popular social networking platforms.

As per a report published in April 2016 by VCCircle, the app claims to have 20 million users, and is accepted at around 9,000 merchant locations and 10,000 online sites.

The services include money transfer, mobile & DTHTV payments, utility bill payments, gift cards, travel, movie ticket booking and Virtual Visa. Oxigen is the first online wallet allowing consumers to load cash in their mobile wallet. It enables individuals to transfer money, even if they don't have a bank account.

Oxigen enables payments in different systems with various brand tie-ups.

Accessibility
Oxigen Wallet is available on the iOS App Store and  Google Play Store.

Awards and recognition
 Best Prepaid Payment Instrument for 2014 by National Payments Corporation of India Excellence Awards
 Access to Banking & Financial Services – Use of Technology 2015 by Skoch Group
 Money Transfer Programme Award 2015 by Internet and Mobile Association of India

Projects
Aarambh Ventures is Oxigen's accelerator programme which helps startups to grow and innovate. Kalaage which was the first startup at Aarambh Ventures and it recently got funded.

Sponsorship
The firm appointed cricketer Sachin Tendulkar as its brand ambassador. Oxigen sponsors the Twenty20 squads of South Africa national cricket team and New Zealand national cricket team along with Indian Premier League’s Gujarat Lions franchisee.

References

Financial services companies established in 2004
Companies based in Gurgaon
Payment service providers
Online companies of India
Online payments
Indian companies established in 2004
Mobile payments in India
2004 establishments in Haryana